The organ of Chester Cathedral is the major source of instrumental music at the cathedral, being played for daily services and accompanying the choir, as well as being used for concerts and recitals. The choral tradition at Chester is 900 years old, dating from the foundation of the Bendedictine monastery.

The organists of Chester Cathedral have included the composers Robert White and Malcolm Boyle. The present Organist and Director of Music is Philip Rushforth and the Assistant Organist is Alex Palotai; the post of Assistant Director of Music and Sub Organist is presently vacant. There are lunchtime organ recitals weekly on Thursday. The monthly program of music is available on the cathedral's website.

Organ
In 1844, an organ by Gray & Davison of London was installed in the cathedral, replacing an instrument with parts dating back to 1626, possibly by Father Smith. The organ was rebuilt and enlarged by Whiteley Bros. of Chester in 1876, to include harmonic flutes and reeds by Cavaillé-Coll. It was later moved to its present position at the front of the north transept. In 1910 William Hill and Son of London extensively rebuilt and revoiced the organ, replacing the Cavaillé-Coll reeds with new pipes of their own. The choir division of the organ was enlarged and moved behind the choirstalls on the south side. The instrument was again overhauled by Rushworth and Dreaper of Liverpool in 1969, when a new mechanism and some new pipework made to a design by the organist, Roger Fisher, was installed. Since 1991 the organ has been in the care of David Wells of Liverpool. The organ case is by Sir Gilbert Scott.

Organists

1541 John Brycheley
1551 Thomas Barnes
1558 Richard Saywell
1567 Robert White
1570 Robert Stevenson
1599 Thomas Bateson
1609 John Alien
1613 Michael Done
1614 Thomas Jones
1637 Richard Newbold
1642 Randolph Jewitt
1661 Rev. Peter Stringer
1673 John Stringer
1686 William Key
1699 John Mounterratt
1705 Edmund White
1715 Samuel Davies
1726 Benjamin Worrall
1727 Edmund Baker
1765 Edward Orme
1776 John Bailey
1803 Edward Bailey
1823 George Black
1824 Thomas Haylett
1841 Frederick Gunton
1877 Joseph Cox Bridge
1925 John Thomas Hughes
1930 Charles Hylton Stewart
1932 Malcolm Courtenay Boyle
1949 James Roland Middleton
1964 John Sanders
1967 Roger Fisher
1997 David Poulter 
2008 Philip Rushforth

Assistant organists

Mr. Munns 1857
Herbert Stephen Irons 1872 - 1876
Joseph Cox Bridge 1876 - 1877 (then organist)
John Gumi ???? - 1890
John Thomas Hughes 1893 - 1925 (then organist)
Guillaume Ormond 1925 - 1926 (later organist of Truro Cathedral)
James Roland Middleton 1934 - 1944 (later organist of Chelmsford Cathedral)
George Guest 1944 - 1947
Brian Runnett 1955 - 1960
Peter Gilbert White 1960 - 1962
Harold Hullah 1962 - 1967
John Belcher 1967 - 1971
John Cooper Green 1971 - 1975
John Keys 1975 - 1978
Simon Russell 1978 - ????
Lee Ward ???? - 1989
Graham Eccles 1989 - 1998
Philip Stopford 2000 - 2003  
Ian Roberts 2003-2011
Benjamin Chewter 2011 - 2016
Andrew Wyatt 2016- 2020

References

English organists
Chester Cathedral